The CWA Southwestern Heavyweight Championship was a short-lived professional wrestling championship defended in the United States Wrestling Association (USWA, formerly the Championship Wrestling Association, hence the CWA name) and the World Class Wrestling Association (WCWA) during their joint promotion in 1989 and 1990. The title was abandoned when the two companies split.

The Dirty White Boy defeated Dustin Rhodes in the finals of a tournament to become the first CWA Southwestern Heavyweight Champion, records are unclear on who else competed in the tournament. Three wrestlers in total have shared seven total reigns, with Bill Dundee and John Tatum tied for most with three each. Dundee held the championship for a combined 205 days, longer than anyone else. His first reign, from November 19, 1989, to May 3, 1990, is the longest of any individual reign at 165 days.

The CWA Southwestern Heavyweight Championship is often mistakenly listed as being part of the USWA Southern Heavyweight Championship history. As it is a professional wrestling championship, it is won not by actual competition, but by a scripted ending to a match.

Title history

List of combined reigns
Key

Footnotes

References

See also
Championship Wrestling Association
United States Wrestling Association
World Class Wrestling Association

Continental Wrestling Association championships
United States Wrestling Association championships
World Class Championship Wrestling championships
Heavyweight wrestling championships
Regional professional wrestling championships